George Charles Ballas Sr. (June 28, 1925 – June 25, 2011) was an American entrepreneur. He invented the first string trimmer, known as the Weed Eater in 1971. He is the father of ballroom dancer, Corky Ballas, and grandfather of professional dancer Mark Ballas of Dancing with the Stars.

Early life
Ballas was born in Ruston, Louisiana. He was the son of Karolos ("Charles") Ballas and Maria (née Lymnaos), who were Greek immigrants that ran a restaurant. His brother is Peter Ballas.

He enlisted in the United States Army at the age of 17 in 1942 during World War II and was a bombardier. Ballas would later serve in the Korean War.

Family
He married Maria Marulanda who was of Mexican and Spanish descent in 1951.

He had five children, including Corky Ballas.

His grandson Mark Ballas is a dancer in Dancing with the Stars. He had six other grandchildren.

Inventor
Ballas got the idea for the trimmer while driving through an automatic car wash, where the rotating brushes gave him an idea. Using a tin can laced with fishing line and an edge trimmer, he tried out his idea, which worked. After some refinements, he shopped it around to several tool makers, who all rejected his invention. He went on to develop the garden tool himself. The first year, sales were over a half million dollars. By 1977 they were $80 million, and Ballas sold his company the following year to Emerson Electric Company.

References

1925 births
2011 deaths
20th-century American inventors
American people of Greek descent
Businesspeople from Houston
Military personnel from Houston
United States Army Air Forces personnel of World War II
American military personnel of the Korean War
20th-century American businesspeople
Ballas family